Iker Undabarrena Martínez (born 18 May 1995) is a Spanish professional footballer who plays for CD Leganés as a defensive midfielder.

Club career

Athletic Bilbao
Born in Gorliz, Biscay, Undabarrena joined Athletic Bilbao's youth system in 2005, aged 10. He made his senior debuts with farm team CD Basconia of the Tercera División, in the 2012–13 season. On 28 November 2012, at only 17, Undabarrena made his official debut with the main squad, coming on as a substitute for Igor Martínez in the 77th minute of a 2–0 away win against Hapoel Ironi Kiryat Shmona F.C. in the campaign's UEFA Europa League.

Having moved up to play for the reserves in summer 2013, Undabarrena played a prominent role in the team's promotion to the second tier the following season, starting 28 regular league matches and all six of the successful play-offs run.

Almost three years after his European bow, Undabarrena made his domestic professional debut on 24 August 2015, starting in a 0–1 home loss against Girona FC. He appeared in almost all of the domestic league matches until 13 February 2016, when he suffered a rupture of the anterior cruciate ligament in his left knee during a fixture against Real Valladolid, requiring a lengthy rehabilitation. Returning to the team eight months later at the end of October, he went on to take part in the majority of the remaining matches during 2016–17 before being withdrawn from the final few games as a precaution to complete his recovery.

Undabarrena started the first four fixtures of the next campaign, but then suffered another ACL tear during training, this time to his right knee. In the same period, similar injuries were endured by Aitor Seguín, Undabarrena's long-time teammate (he also joined Athletic's academy as a 10-year-old in 2005) which hampered the development of both players and damaged their hopes of moving up to the senior squad; during Undabarrena's lengthy absences, midfielder Mikel Vesga was promoted instead.

Despite making a successful return to the B-team with ten appearances and one goal between March and May (including two in the promotion play-offs), Undabarrena was released by Athletic Bilbao on the expiry of his contract on 1 July 2018, ending a 13-year association with the club.

Later years
On 3 July 2018, free agent Undaberrena agreed a deal to join second-tier CD Tenerife (at the time coached by former Athletic Bilbao player Joseba Etxeberria) on a three-year contract. On 31 August 2020, he moved to fellow league team CE Sabadell FC.

Undabarrena moved abroad for the first time on 6 August 2021, signing a two-year deal at Portuguese club C.D. Tondela under fellow Basque Pako Ayestarán. He made his Primeira Liga debut two days later in a 3–0 opening day win over C.D. Santa Clara, as a late substitute. On 23 October, he was sent off within half an hour of a 3–1 loss to visitors FC Porto, for a foul on Mehdi Taremi.

On 26 August 2022, after suffering relegation, Undabarrena returned to Spain after signing a one-year deal with CD Leganés in division two.

International career
Undabarrena started representing Spain at under-17 level, appearing in friendlies against Belgium and Montenegro.

Personal life
He is not related to Eneko Undabarrena, also a midfielder who played for several clubs in the region during the same period.

Honours
Tondela
Taça de Portugal: runner-up 2021–22

References

External links

1995 births
Living people
People from Mungialdea
Spanish footballers
Footballers from the Basque Country (autonomous community)
Association football midfielders
Segunda División players
Segunda División B players
Tercera División players
CD Basconia footballers
Bilbao Athletic footballers
Athletic Bilbao footballers
CD Tenerife players
CE Sabadell FC footballers
CD Leganés players
Primeira Liga players
Liga Portugal 2 players
C.D. Tondela players
Spain youth international footballers
Spanish expatriate footballers
Expatriate footballers in Spain
Spanish expatriate sportspeople in Portugal
Sportspeople from Biscay